Whoops Apocalypse is a six-part 1982 television sitcom by Andrew Marshall and David Renwick, made by London Weekend Television for ITV. Marshall and Renwick later reworked the concept as a 1986 film of the same name from ITC Entertainment, with almost completely different characters and plot, although one or two of the original actors returned in different roles.

The British budget label Channel 5 Video released a compilation cassette of all six episodes edited together into one 137-minute chunk in 1987.

In 2010, Network released both the complete, unedited series and the movie on a 2-DVD set (Region 2) entitled Whoops Apocalypse: The Complete Apocalypse. (Rights issues were simplified by the fact that both LWT and ITC Entertainment productions were by this time owned by Granada Television).

In March 2022 the series was made available for streaming on BritBox.

Series
The series details the weeks leading up to the Apocalypse.  It features a chaotic and increasingly unstable global political situation in which nuclear alerts are accidentally triggered by malfunctioning Space Invaders machines. The naive and highly unpopular Republican U.S. President Johnny Cyclops (an obvious Ronald Reagan parody, played by Barry Morse) is advised by an insane right-wing fundamentalist security advisor, called The Deacon, who claims to have a direct hotline to God. (The Deacon was so named because of the previous role of the actor who played him (John Barron) as a Cathedral Dean in the sitcom All Gas and Gaiters; the writers claimed not to know at the time that Alexander Haig, Reagan's first Secretary of State, was known as The Vicar in the White House.)

In the Eastern Hemisphere, things are similarly unstable. Soviet Premier Dubienkin (Richard Griffiths) is in fact a series of clones, which keep dying and being replaced. Meanwhile, the deposed Shah of Iran, Shah Massiq Rassim (Bruce Montague), led by his advisor Abdab (David Kelly) who is always blindfolded to avoid looking upon the Shah's magnificence, is shunted around the world in search of a refuge (spending most of the series in a cross channel ferry's toilet).

The main danger is the Deacon's development of a new super-powerful American nuclear weapon. This is originally called the Johnny Cyclops Bomb; later, when the President vetoes the name, it is renamed the Quark Bomb (Formerly Known As The Johnny Cyclops Bomb After The President of the Same Name). The Deacon arranges for Lacrobat (John Cleese), a disguised international arms smuggler nicknamed The Devil (a parody of Carlos the Jackal), to steal a Quark Bomb and take it to Iran, to help the Shah in his counterrevolution. The Soviets get word of this (via Rassim's parrot) and decide to invade, gaining control over the world's oil supply.

The Soviets have a new ally in British Prime Minister Kevin Pork (Peter Jones), a parody of left-wing Labour politicians Michael Foot and Peter Shore. Pork, who has gone insane and believes himself to be Superman, heads an especially left-wing government (a parody of Foot's Labour Party). The British Foreign Secretary is blackmailed by the Soviets to join the Warsaw Pact. This situation so unnerves the foreign secretary (Geoffrey Palmer, in a role based on David Owen) and the Chancellor of the Exchequer (Richard Davies) that they also lose their sanity, don Green Lantern and Hawkman costumes, and are locked up in a padded cell at 10 Downing St.

The Soviets are also holding two elderly American tourists named Jonathan and Martha Hopper captive. They are constantly tortured by Commissar Alex Solzhenitsyn ("no relation", played by Alexei Sayle) in the belief they are secretly CIA spies. This turns out to be true, but the Hoppers are crushed by a helicopter in a bungled CIA rescue operation. This does not help Cyclops's nosediving popularity rating, which is just below that of Charles Manson. The Deacon stages an assassination attempt in order to help Cyclops' flagging popularity (a reference to the Reagan assassination attempt the year before). It is damaged further when the speeding ambulance carrying Cyclops to the hospital accidentally runs over his highly popular main opponent, Democratic Senator Jimmy Hennessy (a parody of Senator Teddy Kennedy). By the end of the series we're told Cyclops is now less popular than the Boston Strangler. (These developments are followed by a dramatic newsreader named Jay Garrick, and his topless female counterpart across the Atlantic.)

Eventually the Quark Bomb is accidentally detonated in Israel when Lacrobat's attempt to prevent it being incinerated goes horribly wrong, destroying the country and killing most of the US army who were stationed there. Meanwhile, the Shah, who has temporarily been given sanctuary aboard a space shuttle, manages to crash it into the Moscow Kremlin. Believing it to be a bomb, the Russians launch their weapons at America. In the final scene Soviet missiles are on their way to obliterate the United States and President Cyclops has to decide whether to retaliate. The title sequence already showed the aftermath of the decision, Earth reduced to a nuclear wasteland. In a final twist, we discover that the woman we see in the title sequence selling buttons reading "WEAR YOUR MUSHROOM WITH PRIDE" is in fact the First Lady, who was hidden in a fallout shelter and is one of the few survivors of the war.

Cast
 Barry Morse as President Johnny Cyclops
 John Barron as The Deacon, Presidential Advisor
 Richard Griffiths as Premier Dubienkin
 John Cleese as Lacrobat
 Peter Jones as Prime Minister Kevin Pork
 Bruce Montague as Shah Mashiq Rassim
 Ed Bishop as Jay Garrick, Newsreader
 Geoffrey Palmer as British Foreign Secretary
 Richard Davies as British Chancellor of the Exchequer
 Alexei Sayle as Commissar Solzhenitsyn
 David Kelly as Abdab

Also appearing are: Kirstie Pooley as British Newsreader, Matt Zimmerman as Dean, Bob Sherman as Buzz, Lou Hirsch as Jed Grodd, Jack Klaff as Dwight, Ed Devereaux as General E.F. "Gizzard" Pemberley, Rik Mayall as Biff and small uncredited roles by Stuart Milligan, Carmen Silvera, John Dair and Pat Astley.

Film
In 1986, a film of the same title was released. The plot of the film is almost completely different from the TV series, but does share certain commonalities.

British Prime Minister Sir Mortimer Chris (Peter Cook), a conservative politician who goes insane, is a fusion of US President Johnny Cyclops and UK Prime Minister Kevin Pork.

External links

1980s British satirical television series
ITV sitcoms
Television series by ITC Entertainment
English-language television shows
1982 British television series debuts
1982 British television series endings
1980s British sitcoms
British political comedy television series
Television shows adapted into films
Apocalyptic television series
London Weekend Television shows